Rogoff is a surname based on an alternate spelling of Rogov. Notable people with the surname include:

 Alice Rogoff (born 1951), publisher and philanthropist
 Barbara Rogoff, academic
 Irit Rogoff, academic
 Kenneth Rogoff (born 1953), economist and chess grandmaster
 Lynn Rogoff, film and television producer
 Seth Rogoff, (born 1976 Portland), translator and publisher

 Clair Rogoff, (born 1977), singer, songwriter

See also
 Rogov